Rogan josh also spelled roghan josh or roghan ghosht, is an aromatic curried meat dish originating from Kashmir.

It is made with red meat—traditionally lamb, mutton, or goat—and coloured and flavoured primarily by alkanet flower (or root) and Kashmiri chilies. It is one of the signature recipes of Kashmiri cuisine.

Etymology

A number of origins of the name have been suggested. Roughan means "clarified butter" or "oil" in Persian and Hindi, while juš (alternatively romanised josh) means to "stew" or "braise" and ultimately derives from the verb jušidan meaning "to boil". Rogan josh, by this definition, may mean "stewed in ghee".

An alternative etymology is that the name derives from either the word roghan, "brown" or "red", or the Koshur roghan, "red", along with the word either for "meat", (gošt) often romanized as "rogan ghosht" or "gosht", or a word meaning "juice", giving possible meanings of "red meat" or "red juice". The exact etymology remains uncertain as both "rogan josh" and "rogan ghosht" are used to refer to the dish and it is unclear which of the names is the original.

Origin
Rogan josh is a staple of Kashmiri cuisine and is one of the main dishes of the Kashmiri multicourse meal (the wazwan). The dish was originally brought to Kashmir by the Mughals, whose cuisine was, in turn, influenced by Persian cuisine. The unrelenting summer heat of the central Indian plains took the Mughals frequently to the country's northern region, Kashmir, which has a cooler climate because of its elevation and latitude.

Preparation
Rogan josh consists of pieces of lamb or mutton braised with a gravy flavoured with garlic, ginger and aromatic spices (clove, bay leaves, cardamom, and cinnamon), and in some versions incorporating onions or yogurt. After initial braising, the dish may be finished using the dampokhtak slow cooking technique. Its characteristic deep red colour traditionally comes from dried flowers or root of Alkanna tinctoria (ratan jot) and from liberal amounts of dried, deseeded Kashmiri chilies (lal mirch). These chilies, whose flavor approximates that of paprika, are considerably milder than the typical dried cayenne pepper of Indian cuisine. The recipe's spice emphasises aroma rather than heat. Saffron is also part of some traditional recipes.

There are significant differences in preparation between the Hindu and Muslim dishes in Kashmir: Muslims use praan, a local form of shallot, and petals of maval, the cockscomb flower, for colouring (and for its supposed "cooling" effect); Hindus eschew these, along with garlic and onions, but may add yogurt to give additional body and flavour.

Adaptations
While the traditional preparation uses whole dried chilies that are de-seeded, soaked in water, and ground to a paste, non-traditional shortcuts use either Kashmiri chili powder (available in Indian stores) or a mixture of paprika (predominantly) and cayenne pepper, adjusted to taste. (Madhur Jaffrey's recipe calls for a 4:1 ratio of paprika to cayenne.) An updated version served in Sanjeev Kapoor's restaurants uses white and black cardamom, anise, and bay leaves.

Many western interpretations of the dish add tomatoes to the sauce. This is especially common with ready-made pour-over cooking sauces to the point where the dish may be considered tomato-based. The authenticity of including tomatoes is disputed: some authors state that tomatoes are not part of the traditional dish or of traditional Indian cuisine and should not be included. However, other authors have specifically referred to rogan josh as a dish based around meat and tomatoes, while others have identified tomatoes with a Punjabi version of the dish as opposed to a Kashmiri one.

With other meats
There is a variety with beef as well, brisket being preferred.

References

Kashmiri cuisine
Asian cuisine
Mughlai cuisine
Lamb dishes
Goat dishes